A junk (Chinese: 船, chuán) is a type of Chinese sailing ship with fully battened sails. There are two types of junk in China: northern junk, which developed from Chinese river boats, and southern junk, which developed from Austronesian ships visiting southern Chinese coasts since the 3rd century CE. They continued to evolve in later dynasties and were predominantly used by Chinese traders throughout Southeast Asia. Similar junk sails were also adopted by other East Asian countries, most notably Japan where junks were used as merchant ships to trade goods with China and Southeast Asia. They were found, and in lesser numbers are still found, throughout Southeast Asia and India, but primarily in China. Historically, a Chinese junk could be one of many types of small coastal or river ships, usually serving as a cargo ship, pleasure boat, or houseboat, but also ranging in size up to large ocean-going vessel. Found more broadly today is a growing number of modern recreational junk-rigged sailboats. There can be significant regional variations in the type of rig or the layout of the vessel; however, they all employ fully battened sails.

The term "junk" (Portuguese junco; Dutch jonk; and Spanish junco) was also used in the colonial period to refer to any medium- to large-sized ships of the Austronesian cultures in Island Southeast Asia, with or without the junk rig. Examples include the Indonesian and Malaysian jong, the Philippine karakoa and lanong, and the Maluku kora kora.

Etymology

Views diverge on whether the origin of the word is from a dialect of Chinese or from a Javanese word. The term may stem from the Chinese chuán ("boat; ship") — The modern Mandarin Chinese word for an ocean-going wooden cargo vessel is cáo.

Pierre-Yves Manguin and Zoetmulder, among others, point to an Old Javanese origin, in the form of jong (transliterated as joṅ). The first record of Old Javanese jong comes from an inscription in Bali dating to the 11th century CE. It entered the Malay and Chinese languages by the 15th century, evidenced by a Chinese word list that identifies it as a Malay word for ship. The late 15th century Undang-Undang Laut Melaka, a maritime code composed by Javanese shipowners in Melaka, uses jong frequently as the word for freight ships. European writings from 1345 through 1601 use a variety of related terms, including jonque (French), ioncque, ionct, giunchi, zonchi (Italian), iuncque, joanga, juanga (Spanish), junco (Portuguese), and ionco, djonk, jonk (Dutch). These terms are commonly used to describe all kinds of large ships encountered in Southeast Asia, as well as Chinese ships. Bao Zunpeng, a scholar from Taiwan, believes that the word jong is the "zong" (粽) in Chinese. In terms of sound it is very similar, but the original meaning of "zong" refers to the fleet, which does not match the original meaning of jong.

The origin of the word "junk" in the English language can be traced to the Portuguese word junco, which is rendered from the Arabic word j-n-k (جنك). This word comes from the fact that the Arabic script cannot represent the sound spelled with the digraph "ng". The word was used to denote both the Javanese/Malay ship (jong or djong) and the Chinese ship (chuán), even though the two were markedly different vessels. After the disappearance of jongs in the 17th century, the meaning of "junk" (and other similar words in European languages), which until then was used as a transcription of the word "jong" in Malay and Javanese, changed its meaning to exclusively refer to the Chinese ship (chuán).

Construction 

The historian Herbert Warington Smyth considered the junk as one of the most efficient ship designs, stating that "As an engine for carrying man and his commerce upon the high and stormy seas as well as on the vast inland waterways, it is doubtful if any class of vessel… is more suited or better adapted to its purpose than the Chinese or Indian junk, and it is certain that for flatness of sail and handiness, the Chinese rig is unsurpassed".

Sails 

Iconographic remains show that Chinese ships before the 12th century used square sails. A ship carving from a stone Buddhist stele shows a ship with square sail from the Liu Sung dynasty or the Liang dynasty (ca. 5th or 6th century). Dunhuang cave temple no. 45 (from the 8th or 9th century) features large sailboats and sampans with inflated square sails. A wide ship with a single sail is depicted in the Xi'an mirror (after the 9th or 12th century). Eastern lug sail, which used battens and is commonly known as "junk rig", was likely not Chinese in origin: The oldest depiction of a battened junk sail comes from the Bayon temple at Angkor Thom, Cambodia. From its characteristics and location, it is likely that the ship depicted in Bayon was a Southeast Asian ship. The Chinese themselves may have adopted them around the 12th century CE.

The full-length battens of the junk sail keep the sail flatter than ideal in all wind conditions. Consequently, their ability to sail close to the wind is poorer than other fore-and-aft rigs.

Hull 
Classic junks were built of softwoods (although after the 17th century teak was used in Guangdong) with the outside shape built first. Then multiple internal compartment/bulkheads accessed by separate hatches and ladders, reminiscent of the interior structure of bamboo, were built in. Traditionally, the hull has a horseshoe-shaped stern supporting a high poop deck. The bottom is flat in a river junk with no keel (similar to a sampan), so that the boat relies on a daggerboard, leeboard or very large rudder to prevent the boat from slipping sideways in the water.

Another characteristic of junks, interior compartments or bulkheads, strengthened the ship and slowed flooding in case of holing. Ships built in this manner were written of in Zhu Yu's book Pingzhou Table Talks, published by 1119 during the Song dynasty. Again, this type of construction for Chinese ship hulls was attested to by the Moroccan Muslim Berber traveler Ibn Battuta (1304–1377 CE), who described it in great detail (refer to Technology of the Song dynasty).

Benjamin Franklin wrote in a 1787 letter on the project of mail packets between the United States and France:

Similar wet wells were also apparent in Roman small craft of the 5th century CE.

Leeboards and centerboards 

Other innovations included the square-pallet bilge pump, which was adopted by the West during the 16th century for work ashore, the western chain pump, which was adopted for shipboard use, being of a different derivation. Junks also relied on the compass for navigational purposes. However, as with almost all vessels of any culture before the late 19th century, the accuracy of magnetic compasses aboard ship, whether from a failure to understand deviation (the magnetism of the ship's iron fastenings) or poor design of the compass card (the standard drypoint compasses were extremely unstable), meant that they did little to contribute to the accuracy of navigation by dead reckoning. Indeed, a review of the evidence shows that the Chinese embarked magnetic pointer was probably little used for navigation. The reasoning is simple. Chinese mariners were as able as any and, had they needed a compass to navigate, they would have been aware of the almost random directional qualities when used at sea of the water bowl compass they used. Yet that design remained unchanged for some half a millennium. Western sailors, coming upon a similar water bowl design (no evidence as to how has yet emerged) very rapidly adapted it in a series of significant changes such that within roughly a century the water bowl had given way to the dry pivot, a rotating compass card a century later, a lubberline a generation later and gimbals seventy or eighty years after that. These were necessary because in the more adverse climatic context of north western Europe, the compass was needed for navigation. Had similar needs been felt in China, Chinese mariners would also have come up with fixes.

Steering 

Junks employed stern-mounted rudders centuries before their adoption in the West for the simple reason that Western hull forms, with their pointed sterns, obviated a centreline steering system until technical developments in Scandinavia created the first, iron mounted, pintle and gudgeon 'barn door' western examples in the early 12th century CE. A second reason for this slow development was that the side rudders in use were still extremely efficient. Thus the junk rudder's origin, form and construction was completely different in that it was the development of a centrally mounted stern steering oar, examples of which can also be seen in Middle Kingdom (c. 2050–1800 BCE) Egyptian river vessels. It was an innovation which permitted the steering of large ships and due to its design allowed height adjustment according to the depth of the water and to avoid serious damage should the junk ground. A sizable junk can have a rudder that needed up to twenty members of the crew to control in strong weather. In addition to using the sail plan to balance the junk and take the strain off the hard to operate and mechanically weakly attached rudder, some junks were also equipped with leeboards or dagger boards. The world's oldest known depiction of a stern-mounted rudder can be seen on a pottery model of a junk dating from before the 1st century CE.

History

Spring and Autumn period (8th–5th century BCE) 
Mariners were sailing between islands to cross the Shandong-Liaodong strait and along the Korean coastline by the 8th century BCE. In 710 BCE, due to a famine in Korea, ships sailed to the state of Lu and Qi in Shandong to purchase grain. In 656 BCE, Qi planned a naval invasion of Chu. River traversal by ship was recorded during the Chu-Wu wars in 603 BCE and 549 BCE. A river battle between the two fleets of Chu and Wu occurred in 525 BCE and lost their flagship Yuhuang. According to a poem by Ma Rong 600 years later, the Yuhuang was equipped with sails: "From the Yuhuang to the small boats, all unfurled sails like clouds and displayed awnings like rainbow." Prior to the 12th century, Chinese sails were commonly made of bamboo mats since cotton did not become common in China until the Song–Yuan dynasties. There were reports of Chu building fleets in 528 BCE and 518 BCE but Chu was defeated by Wu's fleet in 489 BCE, and their admiral and seven officers were captured. In 485 BCE, Wu's fleet sailed up the coast to attack Qi and was defeated in the first known naval battle in Chinese history. In 478 BCE, Yue's fleet destroyed Wu's navy.

Warring States and Qin period (5th–3rd century BCE) 
Because of fables that there were islands to the east that possessed the elixir of immortality, King Wei of Qi (r. 356–320 BCE), King Xuan of Qi (r. 319–301 BCE), and King Zhao of Yan (r. 311–279 BCE) sent naval expeditions to search for them. They failed. In the Qin dynasty, a magician named Xu Shi from the former state of Qi requested help to organize an expedition to seek the immortal islands of Penglai, Fangzhang, and Yingzhou. Three thousand young men and women and "artisans of a hundred trades" set sail from Langya in 219 BCE. No news returned of Xu Shi, so Qin Shi Huang sent another expedition with four magicians in 215 BCE. Only one magician named Scholar Lu came back and he deserted in 212 BCE. In 210 BCE, the emperor met Xu Shi, who had failed to bring back the elixir of immortality. He said that the expedition had been frustrated by dragons and sea monsters. They set out with a squadron of crossbowmen and cruised around the Shandong peninsula, where they killed a large fish at Zhifu.

Han to Northern and southern dynasties era (2nd–6th century) 

The Chinese engaged in cross-ocean expeditions by the 2nd century BCE. In 108 BCE, Yang Pu led a sea-force to Korea. The Book of Han mentions sea-going voyages taking 12 months to reach the furthest country. In 230, Sun Quan sent commanders Wei Wen and Zhuge Zhi with a fleet of 10,000 men to seek the islands of Yizhou and Danzhou. The fleet was away for a year and many of the crew died of disease. It did not reach Danzhou but reached Yizhou and returned with several thousand captives. The contemporary writer Shen Ying stated that Yizhou was 2,000 li southeast of Linhai and appears to have been Taiwan. Danzhou was probably the Ryukyu Islands. In 233 CE, a fleet from Eastern Wu was lost in a storm in the Yellow Sea.

Manguin, Pelliot, Ferrand, Miksic, and Flecker, amongst other, believe that the ships used by Chinese travelers were mostly foreign in origin, and Chinese ships were rarely used on the Southeast Asian voyages until the 9th century CE. Chinese ships did exist — but they're essentially fluvial (riverine) in nature and operation. Large Austronesian trading ships docking in Chinese seaports with as many as four sails were recorded by scholars as early as the 3rd century CE. They called them the kunlun bo or kunlun po (崑崙舶, lit. "ship of the Kunlun people"). They were booked by Chinese Buddhist pilgrims for passage to Southern India and Sri Lanka.

The 3rd century book Strange Things of the South (南州異物志, Nánzhōu Yìwùzhì) by Wan Chen (萬震) describes one of these Austronesian ships as being capable of 600–700 people together with more than 10,000 hu (斛) of cargo (250–1000 tons according to various interpretations—600 tons deadweight according to Manguin). The ships could be more than 50 meters in length and had a freeboard of 5.2–7.8 meters. When seen from above they resemble covered galleries. He explains the ships' sail design as follows:

A 260 CE book by K'ang T'ai (康泰), quoted in Taiping Yulan (982 CE) described ships with seven sails called po or ta po (great ship or great junk) that could travel as far as Syria (大秦—Ta-chin, Roman Syria). These ships were used by the Indo-Scythian (月支—Yuezhi) traders for transporting horses. He also made reference to monsoon trade between the islands (or archipelago), which took a month and a few days in a large po.

Sui to the rise of Song dynasty (7th century–10th century) 
In 683 CE, Tang court sent an envoy to Srivijaya, which seems to have been done in foreign ship. Wang Gungwu stated that there are no records from Tang Dynasty era that mentioned Chinese junks being used for trading with Southern countries (Nanhai). Wang also noted that the ships used by Chinese pilgrim and travelers were K'un-lun ships or Indian ships. Chinese and Korean ships sailed to Kyushu for private trade with Japan in the 9th century.

Southern Chinese junks were based on keeled and multi-planked Austronesian ships (known as po by the Chinese, from the Old Javanese parahu, Javanese prau, or Malay perahu — large ship). Southern Chinese junks showed characteristics of Austronesian ships that they are made using timbers of tropical origin, with keeled, V-shaped hull. This is different from northern Chinese junks, which are developed from flat-bottomed riverine boats. The northern Chinese junks were primarily built of pine or fir wood, had flat bottoms with no keel, water-tight bulkheads with no frames, transom (squared) stern and stem, and have their planks fastened with iron nails or clamps.

It was unknown when the Chinese people started adopting Southeast Asian (Austronesian) shipbuilding techniques. They may have been started as early as the 8th century, but the development was gradual and the true ocean-going Chinese junks did not appear suddenly. The word "po" survived in Chinese long after, referring to the large ocean-going junks.

Song dynasty (10th–13th century) 

In 989 CE the Song court permitted private Chinese ships to trade overseas. The ships of the Song, both mercantile and military, became the backbone of the navy of the following Yuan dynasty. In particular the Mongol invasions of Japan (1274–1281), as well as the Mongol invasion of Java (1293), essentially relied on recently acquired Song naval capabilities. In general, they had no keel, stempost, or sternpost. They did have centreboards, and a watertight bulkhead to strengthen the hull, which added great weight. This type of vessel may have been common in the 13th century. By using the ratio between the number of soldiers and ships, Nugroho concluded that each ship may carry a maximum capacity of 30 or 31 men, while using data presented by John Man would result in a capacity of 29–44 men per ship. David Bade estimated a capacity of 20 to 50 men per ship during the Java campaign.

Yuan dynasty (14th century) 

Yuan dynasty ships carry on the tradition of Song, the Yuan navy is essentially Song navy. Both Song and Yuan employed large trading junks. The large ships (up to 5,000 liao or 1520–1860 tons burden) would carry 500–600 men, and the second class (1,000–2,000 liao) would carry 200–300 men. Unlike Ming treasure ships, Song and Yuan great junks are propelled by oars, and have with them smaller junks, probably for maneuvering aids. Large size could be a disadvantage for shallow harbors of southern seas, and the presence of numerous reefs exacerbates this.

The enormous dimensions of the Chinese ships of the Medieval period are described in Chinese sources, and are confirmed by Western travelers to the East, such as Marco Polo, Ibn Battuta and Niccolò da Conti. According to Ibn Battuta, who visited China in 1347:…We stopped in the port of Calicut, in which there were at the time thirteen Chinese vessels, and disembarked. On the China Sea traveling is done in Chinese ships only, so we shall describe their arrangements. The Chinese vessels are of three kinds; large ships called chunks (junks), middle sized ones called zaws (dhows) and the small ones kakams. The large ships have anything from twelve down to three sails, which are made of bamboo rods plaited into mats. They are never lowered, but turned according to the direction of the wind; at anchor they are left floating in the wind. A ship carries a complement of a thousand men, six hundred of whom are sailors and four hundred men-at-arms, including archers, men with shields and crossbows, who throw naphtha. Three smaller ones, the "half", the "third" and the "quarter", accompany each large vessel. These vessels are built in the towns of Zaytun (a.k.a. Zaitun; today's Quanzhou; 刺桐) and Sin-Kalan. The vessel has four decks and contains rooms, cabins, and saloons for merchants; a cabin has chambers and a lavatory, and can be locked by its occupants. This is the manner after which they are made; two (parallel) walls of very thick wooden (planking) are raised and across the space between them are placed very thick planks (the bulkheads) secured longitudinally and transversely by means of large nails, each three ells in length. When these walls have thus been built the lower deck is fitted in and the ship is launched before the upper works are finished.— Ibn Battuta

Ming dynasty (15th–17th century)

Expedition of Zheng He

The largest junks ever built were possibly those of Admiral Zheng He, for his expeditions in the Indian Ocean (1405 to 1433), although this is disputed as no contemporary records of the sizes of Zheng He's ships are known. Instead the dimensions are based on Sanbao Taijian Xia Xiyang Ji Tongsu Yanyi (Eunuch Sanbao Western Records Popular Romance, published 1597), a romanticized version of the voyages written by  nearly two centuries later. Maodeng's novel describes Zheng He's ships as follows:

Modern scholars have argued on engineering grounds that it is highly unlikely that Zheng He's ship was 450 ft in length, Guan Jincheng (1947) proposed a much more modest size of 20 zhang long by 2.4 zhang wide (204 ft by 25.5 ft or 62.2 m by 7.8 m) while Xin Yuan'ou (2002) put them as 61–76 m (200–250 feet) in length.

Comparing to other Ming records, the Chinese seem to have exaggerated their dimensions. European East Indiamen and galleons were said to be 30, 40, 50, and 60 zhang (90, 120, 150, and 180 m). It was not until the mid to late 19th century that the length of the largest western wooden ship began to exceed 100 meters, even this was done using modern industrial tools and iron parts.

Sea ban 

From the mid-15th to early 16th century, all Chinese maritime trading was banned under the Ming Dynasty. The shipping and shipbuilding knowledge acquired during the Song and Yuan dynasties gradually declined during this period.

Accounts of medieval travellers

Niccolò da Conti in relating his travels in Asia between 1419 and 1444, describes huge junks of about 2,000 tons in weight:

 Other translations of the passage give the size as 2000 butts, which would be around 1000 tons, a butt being half a ton. Christopher Wake noted that the transcription of the unit is actually vegetes, that is Venetian butt, and estimated a burthen of 1300 tons. The ship of Conti may have been a Burmese or Indonesian jong.

Also, in 1456, the Fra Mauro map described the presence of junks in the Indian Ocean as well as their construction:

Fra Mauro further explains that one of these junks rounded the Cape of Good Hope and travelled far into the Atlantic Ocean, in 1420:

Javanese junk 

Javanese junks differed from Chinese junks in several respects. The Javanese junk was made of very thick wood, and as the ship got old, it was fixed with new planks, this way they have 3–4 planks, stacked together. The rope and the sail were made with woven rattan. The jong was made using jati wood (teak) at the time of this report (1515), at that time Chinese junks are using softwood as the main material. The Javanese ship's hull is formed by joining planks and keel by wooden dowels and treenails, without using iron bolts or nails. Frame would be built later, after the planking (the "shell first" construction). The planks are perforated by an auger and inserted with dowels, which remain inside the fastened planks, not seen from the outside. The hull was pointed at both ends, they carried two rudders and used tanja sail, but it may also use junk sail. It differed markedly from the Chinese vessel, which had its hull fastened by iron nails and strakes to a frame and to bulkheads. The Chinese vessel had a single rudder on a transom stern, and (except in Fujian and Guangdong) they had flat bottoms without keels. The empire of Majapahit used a very large version of these ships, built in north Java, for transporting troops overseas.

Encounters with giant jongs were recorded by Western travelers. Florentine merchant Giovanni da Empoli (1483–1517), one of the first Italian agents to join a Portuguese armada to India in 1503–1504, said that the junks of Java were no different in their strength than a castle, because the three and four boards, layered one above the other, could not be harmed with artillery. They sailed with their women, children, and families, with everyone mainly keeping to their respective rooms. Portuguese recorded at least two encounters with large jongs, one was encountered off the coast of Pacem (Samudera Pasai Sultanate) and the other was owned by Pati Unus, who went on to attack Malacca in 1513. Characteristics of the 2 ships were similar, both were larger than Portuguese ship, built with multiple plankings, resistant to cannon fire, and had two oar-like rudders on the side of the ship. At least Pati Unus' jong was equipped with three layers of sheathing which the Portuguese said over one cruzado in thickness each. The Chinese banned foreign ships from entering Guangzhou, fearing the Javanese or Malay junks would attack and capture the city, because it is said that one of these junk would rout twenty Chinese junks.

The main production location of jong was mainly constructed in two major shipbuilding centers around Java: north coastal Java, especially around Rembang–Demak (along the Muria strait) and Cirebon; and the south coast of Borneo (Banjarmasin) and adjacent islands. These places have teak forests, whose wood is resistant to shipworm, whereas Borneo itself would supply ironwood. Pegu, which is a large shipbuilding port in the 16th century, also produced jong, built by Javanese who resided there.

Capture of Taiwan 
In 1661, a naval fleet of 400 junks and 25,000 men led by the Ming loyalist Zheng Chenggong (Cheng Ch'eng-kung in Wade–Giles, known in the West as Koxinga), arrived in Taiwan to oust the Dutch from Zeelandia. Following a nine-month siege, Cheng captured the Dutch fortress Fort Zeelandia. A peace treaty between Koxinga and the Dutch Government was signed at Castle Zeelandia on February 1, 1662, and Taiwan became Koxinga's base for the Kingdom of Tungning.

Qing dynasty (19th century) 

Large, ocean-going junks played a key role in Asian trade until the 19th century. One of these junks, Keying, sailed from China around the Cape of Good Hope to the United States and England between 1846 and 1848. Many junks were fitted out with carronades and other weapons for naval or piratical uses. These vessels were typically called "war junks" or "armed junks" by Western navies which began entering the region more frequently in the 18th century. The British, Americans and French fought several naval battles with war junks in the 19th century, during the First Opium War, Second Opium War and in between.

At sea, junk sailors co-operated with their Western counterparts. For example, in 1870 survivors of the English barque Humberstone shipwrecked off Formosa, were rescued by a junk and landed safely in Macao.

Modern period (20th century)

In 1938, E. Allen Petersen escaped the advancing Japanese armies by sailing a  junk, Hummel Hummel, from Shanghai to California with his wife Tani and two White Russians (Tsar loyalists).

In 1955, six young men sailed a Ming dynasty-style junk from Taiwan to San Francisco. The four-month journey aboard the Free China was captured on film and their arrival into San Francisco made international front-page news. The five Chinese-born friends saw an advertisement for an international trans-Atlantic yacht race, and jumped at the opportunity for adventure. They were joined by the then US Vice-Consul to China, who was tasked with capturing the journey on film. Enduring typhoons and mishaps, the crew, having never sailed a century-old junk before, learned along the way. The crew included Reno Chen, Paul Chow, Loo-chi Hu, Benny Hsu, Calvin Mehlert and were led by skipper Marco Chung. Shortly afterward the footage was featured on ABC television's Bold Journey travelogue. Hosted by John Stephenson and narrated by ship's navigator Paul Chow, the program highlighted the adventures and challenges of the junk's sailing across the Pacific, as well as some humorous moments aboard ship.In 1959 a group of Catalan men, led by Jose Maria Tey, sailed from Hong Kong to Barcelona on a junk named Rubia. After their successful journey this junk was anchored as a tourist attraction at one end of Barcelona harbor, close to where La Rambla meets the sea. Permanently moored along with it was a reproduction of Columbus' caravel Santa Maria during the 1960s and part of the 1970s.

In 1981, Christoph Swoboda had a 65 feet (LoA) Bedar built by the boatyard of Che Ali bin Ngah on Duyong island in the estuary of the Terengganu river on the East coast of Malaysia. The Bedar is one of the two types of Malay junk schooners traditionally built there. He sailed this junk with his family and one friend to the Mediterranean and then continued with changing crew to finally finish a circumnavigation in 1998. He sold this vessel in 2000 and in 2004 he started to build a new junk in Duyong with the same craftsmen: the Pinas (or Pinis) Naga Pelangi, in order to help keep this ancient boat building tradition alive. This boat finished to be fitted out in 2010 and is working as a charter boat in the Andaman and the South China Sea.

See also
Casco (barge), flat hulled barges of the Philippines
Pinisi 
Lorcha
Tongkang
Keying, a Chinese junk that was sailed to the US in 1840s
Shipyards in Macau
Junk rig

Notes

References

Works cited

External links

 World of Boats (EISCA) Collection ~ Keying II Hong Kong Junk
 China Seas Voyaging Society
 The Free China, homepage of one of the last remaining 20th century junks, with video.
 The Junk and Advanced Cruising Rig Association, The JRA
 Pirates and Junks in Late Imperial South China

Chinese inventions
Four-masted ships
Naval history of China
Sailboat types
Ship types
Merchant sailing ship types
Sailing rigs and rigging
Ships of China
Three-masted ships
Austronesian ships